Qhapaqa (Aymara for king or sir; rich, Hispanicized spelling Capaja) is a  mountain in the Andes of Bolivia. It lies in the Oruro Department, Sajama Province, in the north of the Turco Municipality. Qhapaqa is situated south of Yaritani and northeast of Chuqil Qamiri.

References 

Mountains of Oruro Department